Geumseong-myeon is a myeon in Uiseong, South Korea. It is well known for Uiseong garlic and Tap-ri (Tower Village) dinosaur/dinosaur fossil.

Uiseong County
Towns and townships in North Gyeongsang Province